The third season of Beverly Hills, 90210, an American teen drama television series aired from July 15, 1992 on Fox and concluded on May 19, 1993 after 30 episodes. Issues such as sex, infidelity, relationships, child molestation, hit and runs, racial discrimination, gang violence, expulsion, pollution, gambling, drug abuse, eating disorders, body image, Protest, grief, and relationship abuse are pushed front and center.

Overview
This season the group of friends will be entering their senior year, which will be a journey filled with  jealousy, secrets, and the desire for vengeance will be present, threatening to ruin lives that were truly just beginning. Brenda's clandestine romance with Dylan shatters her family. Dylan begins to have a relationship with his father. Still depressed over Jake, Kelly seeks comfort from an unexpected source. Donna begins to venture beyond of her comfort zone and seizes a risque chance. Steven, under pressure from his parents, commits an act that may damage his future. Brandon decides to venture into the perilous world of gambling. Andrea begins to really ponder her future as her status at West Bev High is jeopardized due to her secret being revealed. An old friend of David's transfers to West Bev, much to his surprise, but makes a controversy in order to become closer to him, putting the life of someone Andrea cares about in peril, causing tension between the two friends. To make matters worse, David struggles to accept that he will be a senior the next year while Donna and his new friends will be off starting their lives.

Cast

Starring
Jason Priestley as Brandon Walsh  
Shannen Doherty as Brenda Walsh  
Jennie Garth as Kelly Taylor  
Ian Ziering as Steve Sanders  
Gabrielle Carteris as Andrea Zuckerman  
Luke Perry as Dylan McKay  
Brian Austin Green as David Silver  
Tori Spelling as Donna Martin  
Carol Potter as Cindy Walsh  
James Eckhouse as Jim Walsh

Recurring
Joe E. Tata as Nat Bussichio 
Ann Gillespie as Jackie Taylor 
Dana Barron as Nikki Witt
Denise Dowse as Vice Principal Yvonne Teasley 
Mark Kiely as Gil Meyers 
Josh Taylor as Jack McKay

Episodes

Soundtrack
Beverly Hills, 90210: The Soundtrack was released as season three was airing, with several songs from it featured in the show's closing credits.

Ratings

Home media
The DVD release of season three was released in Regions 1, 2 and 4.

References

1992 American television seasons
1993 American television seasons
Beverly Hills, 90210 seasons